Shimada may refer to:

Shimada (surname), a Japanese surname
Shimada (city), Shizuoka, Japan
Shimada-juku
Shimada Station
Shimada (hairstyle), a traditional Japanese hairstyle for women
13678 Shimada, asteroid
NOAAS Bell M. Shimada (R 227), a U.S. National Oceanic and Atmospheric Administration research ship commissioned in 2010